Ashen may refer to:

Adjectival 
Made from ash-wood
Having a colour resembling ash (the unburnable solid remains of a combustion)
In a medical context, ashen describes how a person with cyanosis looks, referring to a bluish hue resulting from a lack of oxygenation of hemoglobin in the blood

Music, media and entertainment
Ashen, a demo by the funeral doom metal band Celestiial
Ashen (2004 video game), a game for N-Gage developed by Torus
Ashen (2018 video game)

People 
Stuart Ashen (born 1976), also known as Ashens, a British Comedian and YouTuber
Ashen Silva (born 1990), Sri Lankan cricketer
Ashen Bandara (born 1998), Sri Lankan cricketer
Ashen Kavinda (born 1991), Sri Lankan cricketer

Places
Ashen, Essex
Ashens, County of Borung

Other
Ashen light, a subtle glow that is seen from the night side of the planet Venus